Chemistry Letters is a peer-reviewed scientific journal published by the Chemical Society of Japan. It specializes in the rapid publication of reviews and letters on all areas of chemistry. The editor-in-chief is Mitsuhiko Shionoya (University of Tokyo). According to the Journal Citation Reports, the journal has a 2014 impact factor of 1.23.

References

External links 
 

Chemistry journals
Publications established in 1972
English-language journals
Academic journals published by learned and professional societies
Monthly journals
Chemical Society of Japan